Robert Francis Callahan (September 26, 1923 – March 10, 2011) was an American football player. He was born in St. Louis, Missouri and attended Beaumont High School where he was the captain of the football and basketball teams.  He played college football as a center for the University of Missouri in 1942, but his education was interrupted by two years in the United States Marine Corps during World War II.  After being discharged from the Marines, Callahan played football as a tackle and center for the University of Michigan in 1945 and 1946.

In January 1947, Callahan announced that he was leaving school and hoped to play professional football.  He was drafted by the Chicago Cardinals in the 31st round (289th overall pick) of the 1947 NFL Draft.  He opted instead to sign with the Brooklyn Dodgers in April 1947, but he did not appear in any games.  In 1948, he signed with the Buffalo Bills in the All-America Football Conference.  He appeared in  seven games as a center and linebacker for the Bills during the 1948 AAFC season.  Callahan died in March 2011.  His last listed residence was in Orange County, California.

References

1923 births
2011 deaths
American football centers
American football linebackers
Buffalo Bills (AAFC) players
Michigan Wolverines football players
Missouri Tigers football players
United States Marine Corps personnel of World War II
United States Marines
Players of American football from St. Louis